Bojia may refer to:
 Bojia, a village in Cornereva Commune, Caraș-Severin County, Romania
 Yadesa Bojia, Ethiopian-American artist

See also 
 Bogia (disambiguation)